Nikolay Anatolyevich Chavkin (Cyrillic: Николай Анатольевич Чавкин; born 24 April 1984 in Moscow) is a Russian runner specialising in the 3000 metres steeplechase. He competed in that event at the 2012 Summer Olympics, failing to qualify for the final.

Competition record

References

1984 births
Living people
Athletes from Moscow
Russian male steeplechase runners
Olympic male steeplechase runners
Olympic athletes of Russia
Athletes (track and field) at the 2012 Summer Olympics
World Athletics Championships athletes for Russia
Russian Athletics Championships winners